Bake Oven Knob is a high point on the Blue Mountain ridge of the Appalachian Mountains near Germansville, Pennsylvania. Due to its location on the Appalachian Trail, it has become a popular spot for hiking.

Hiking 
Bake Oven Knob is a relatively accessible location on the Appalachian Trail. Parking is located just  from the site. The hike is rocky, which a few points that require some scrambling, especially when attempting to reach certain lookouts.

Lookouts 
Bake Oven Knob offers views on either side of the Appalachian Trail, facing north and south, making the spot popular for hawk and eagle watching. However, due to their accessibility, these lookouts are often crowded, and have become heavily vandalized.

Shelter 
The shelter is one of the oldest of its kind in Pennsylvania, having been constructed in 1937. It has accommodations for about six people, but has no outhouse. There is a spring at the site of the shelter, but it is occasionally dry.

References 

Mountains of Pennsylvania
Landforms of Lehigh County, Pennsylvania
Tourist attractions in Lehigh County, Pennsylvania
Mountains on the Appalachian Trail